Ocnița is a town and the administrative center of Ocnița District, Moldova.

References

Cities and towns in Moldova
Khotinsky Uyezd
Ocnița District